Vanadium oxydichloride is the inorganic compound with the formula VOCl2.   One of several oxychlorides of vanadium, it is a hygroscopic green solid.  It is prepared by comproportionation of vanadium trichloride and vanadium(V) oxides:
V2O5  +  VOCl3  +  3 VCl3  →  6 VOCl2

As verified by X-ray crystallography, vanadium oxydichloride adopts a layered structure, featuring octahedral vanadium centers linked by doubly bridging oxide and chloride ligands.

References

Vanadium(IV) compounds
Oxychlorides
Metal halides